Boecillo is a municipality located in the province of Valladolid, Castile and León, Spain. As of 2018, the population is 4,154.

It has its own casino, opened in 1986. It is located in the Palace of Condes de Gamazo, neoclassical building of the late nineteenth century, and was the residence of Germán Gamazo.

The Mayor is Pedro Luis Díez Ortega of the People's Party.

Its technology park is one of the most important in northern Spain. It contains different companies, including a firm that collaborates with NASA, whose director is the Spanish astronaut Pedro Duque.

See also
Cuisine of the province of Valladolid

References 

Municipalities in the Province of Valladolid